Rusty Edwards is a hymnwriter who was born in Dixon, Illinois, on January 22, 1955. 

Dozens of his hymns have been published in 100 books in Australia, Brasil,  Canada, China, Czech Republic,  England, Ireland, Japan, New Zealand, Scotland, and USA. He has published six collections of hymns, including The Yes of the Heart (with a foreword by Chick Corea), Grateful Praise, As Sunshine to a Garden, Each Breath Every Heartbeat (Abingdon Nashville) and Bidden, Unbidden. His sixth book is Uncommon Mercy was written with co-writers from fifteen countries. Dave Brubeck wrote a tune for his song "As the Moon is to the Sun", which is included in the 2008 book, Dave Brubeck at the Piano. His best-known songs so far are: "We All are one in Mission", "Praise the One Who Breaks the Darkness", "Now it is Evening", and "Each Breath, Every Heartbeat" and “Grace, Point Us Toward God (co-written by Jen Butler.)  He was a Visiting Fellow at Africa University in Zimbabwe in 2012. In 2015, he received an honorary Doctor of Divinity degree from Lutheran Theological Southern Seminary at Lenoir-Rhyne University. He has also led workshops in Brasil, Russia, England, and Sweden.

External links
 Page at Selah Publishing

1955 births
Living people
People from Dixon, Illinois
Christian hymnwriters